Takreem is a non-profit organization founded in 2009 by Ricardo Karam to honor Arab individuals or organizations that have contributed to the development of their respective communities and to the betterment of the world in the fields culture, education, science, environmental studies, humanitarian services, and socio-economic development.

History

The idea of Takreem was first introduced by Ricardo Karam in 2004, yet the actual foundation was only launched in 2009. Karam observed guests he had interviewed on his talk show, and realized that the Arab world needed to highlight more of its achievers. In one of his interviews, he states: “…every year we try to spot different achievers from different fields, and we try to give hope to the youth by telling [them to] look at these examples. You can make it as well." 

Karam officially announced the launching of Takreem at a press conference held at École supérieure des affaires (ESA), Beirut.

Takreem organizes conferences, symposiums, and meetings. It offers mentorships and holds an annual Awards Ceremony celebrated in a different city every year. By highlighting examples of success from the Arab world, the foundation challenges the negative stereotypical image of the region, and embraces creativity, freedom of thought, human rights, entrepreneurship, advanced technology, and gender equality.

In 2018, Takreem launched TAKminds, an interdisciplinary think-tank bringing together thought-leaders, change-makers, and professionals.

In 2019, Takreem decided to expand its activities to reach the Arab diasporas in both Americas. Takreem America was launched in 2022.

Activities

Takreem holds year-round activities such as conferences, panel discussions, talks, forums, in addition to its annual awards ceremony. These activities host speakers from different parts of the world who share their insights on important issues drawing on their life experiences and careers.

Conferences

Panel discussions

TAKminds 
TAKminds also provides the talents of the Arab world with a platform where they can connect, build bridges and together find new ways to create sustainable communities and opportunities for the Arab youth.

Award ceremonies

Laureates selection process
Nominations:

Takreem uses a strict framework for its candidate selection process with one single mandatory prerequisite: Arab ancestry, except for one: the International Contribution to Arab Society category. This framework operates in an unbiased and non-discriminatory manner, giving equal rights to entry without regard to religion, gender, nationality, political beliefs, or age.

Once deemed eligible, candidates are classed in the most suitable category.

Selection process:

Takreem established a comprehensive evaluation process to assess candidates, select the finalists, and set the winners apart. The two-stage screening process involves a Selection Board and a Jury Board whose experienced and diligent members evaluate eligible applicants through pre-determined by-laws.

The Selection Board drafts a short list of candidates for the Jury Board to appraise and select a laureate for each of Takreem's nine categories. The grading is classified, and the identity of the laureates is only disclosed on the night of the ceremony.

Award categories 

Takreem presents each year an award in each of the nine following categories to one individual or institution:

 Young Entrepreneur
 Scientific and Technological Achievement
 Cultural Excellence
 Environmental Development and Sustainability
 Outstanding Arab Woman
 Excellence in Education
 Humanitarian and Civic Services
 Corporate Leadership
 International Contribution to Arab Society

Takreem also honors renowned personalities through three different options:

 Lifetime Achievement Award
 Special Distinction
 Legacy Award

Jury board members

Laureates

Honorary distinctions

Takreem America 

In 2019, Takreem established a branch in the United States, Takreem America, also known as Takreem USA.

References

ar:تكريم

Arab culture
Organisations based in Lebanon
Lebanese awards